Channelview High School is a senior high school in Channelview, Harris County, Texas, United States of America  It is a part of the Channelview Independent School District.

Academics
The school educates over 2,500 students in grades 9-12. For academic year 2015–16, 93.6% of students had been awarded their high school diplomas by the end of the year.

Incidents
On March 13, 2018, a chartered school bus, carrying students from the school band, plunged down a ravine in Alabama, killing the driver. All 46 passengers suffered injuries.

Athletics
The Channelview American football team plays in an 8,000 seat stadium. The stadium, municipally funded, was opened in 2012 at a cost of $27 million.

Notable alumni
 Jalen Hurts, (2016) an American football player for the Philadelphia Eagles
 Johnny Knox, American football player
 Guy A. J. LaBoa, soldier
 Olen Underwood, American football player
 Glenn Wilson, Major League Baseball player

References

External links
 

Public high schools in Harris County, Texas